Sofia Ionescu-Ogrezeanu (25 April 1920 – 21 March 2008) was the first female neurosurgeon in the world.

Early life
Ionescu was born in Fălticeni, Suceava County, daughter of Constantin Ogrezeanu, a bank cashier, and Maria Ogrezeanu, housewife.

Ionescu's interest in medicine began after she met one of her best friends, Aurelia Dumitru, and her father, Dr. Dumitru. The death of one of her school friends, who died in Paris due to an infection after brain surgery, impelled Ionescu to apply to medical school.

Education
She attended high school first in Fălticeni and then in Bucharest. Supported by her mother, she applied to the  Faculty of Medicine of Bucharest in 1939. In her first internship year, she studied ophthalmology. Next year, she spent in Suceava at a poorly-equipped clinic during a typhus epidemic. During a school break, she volunteered to take care of Soviet prisoners at Stamate Hospital in Fălticeni. She entered the surgical service of the hospital, doing her first surgical operations, mostly amputations.

In October 1943, she became an intern at Hospital Nr. 9 in Bucharest. In 1944, during the Bombing of Bucharest in World War II, she was forced to perform an emergency brain surgery on an injured boy due to lack of sufficient medical staff. In 1945, she became certified in medicine and surgery.

Career
They formed the first neurological team of Romania, later called "The golden team", which helped develop neurosurgery in Romania.

In 1970, the favorite wife of the Sheikh of Abu Dhabi had become ill. As a man could not enter the harem, they needed to find a female doctor. Ionescu stayed one week at the woman’s side and cured her. As a reward the sheik gave her 2,000 dollars and an expensive piece of jewelry. She died on 21 March 2008 in Bucharest.

References

Further reading

External links

Sofia Ionescu

1920 births
2008 deaths
People from Fălticeni
Romanian neurosurgeons
Romanian women physicians
20th-century surgeons
Carol Davila University of Medicine and Pharmacy alumni